Pacem may refer to :

Si vis pacem, para bellum is a Latin adage translated as, "If you wish for peace, prepare for war". 
Dona nobis pacem is a phrase in the Agnus Dei section of the Roman Catholic mass
Dona nobis pacem is a cantata written by Ralph Vaughan Williams in 1936. 
Pacem in terris was a papal encyclical issued by Pope John XXIII on 11 April 1963. 
The Pacem in Terris Award has been awarded annually since 1964. 
The association of Catholic Clergy Pacem in Terris was a regime-sponsored organisation of Catholic clergy in the communist Czechoslovakia between 1971 and 1989.
Pacem is a planet serving as the base of the Catholic Church in the science fiction series Hyperion Cantos.
Pacem, the 16th-century European name for Pasai, a place in Sumatra